Kazumba is a location in Kasai-Central, the Democratic Republic of the Congo. It is served by a station on the mainline of the national railways of Congo. It is home to the Cathedral of St. Joseph Mikalayi, a Roman Catholic cathedral.

See also 

 Railway stations in DRCongo

References 

Populated places in Kasaï-Central